butv10 is Boston University’s student-operated media production and distribution network. Live-streamed and on-demand programming is available online at butv10.com and on  campus television channel 10.

Established in 1989 as BUTV and rebranded butv10 in 2005, the organization produces an array of news, information, sports, drama, comedy, and variety programming. Content has received multiple Associated Press, NATAS, Telly, and Webby Award recognitions.

Open to any BU student, annual membership exceeds 250. butv10’s 14 productions and administrative departments are based at the Boston University College of Communication.

Origins
Though students had been producing content for years under the organization known as BUTV, Boston University had no formal distribution platform. According to butv10 faculty advisor Christophor Cavalieri, once the campus was wired for cable, the plan for a student-run television station was initiated in September 2005. The name BUTV10 was announced in November 2005, and the channel premiered on February 22, 2006. The student production group was also renamed Growling Dog Productions.

Past and current programs

Awards and nominations 
butv10 has received various awards and nominations. In 2007, Inside Boston executive producers Ted Fioraliso and Brittany Oat won the Fox News Channel College Challenge for a news package on an eminent domain case, receiving cash prizes for themselves and butv10.

References

External links 
 
 Boston University College of Communication

Student television stations in the United States
Boston University